Lonzo Bullie (born October 24, 1947) is former American football coach. He served as the head football coach at Tuskegee University in Tuskegee, Alabama from 1981 to 1983 and Knoxville College in Knoxville, Tennessee from 1984 to 1989.

Coaching career
Bullie was the 12th head football coach at Tuskegee University in Tuskegee, Alabama, serving for  three seasons, from 1981 to 1983. His record at Tuskegee was 19–13.

Later life
Bullie remained in the Tuskegee community and is now the principal of Tuskegee Institute Middle School in Tuskegee, Alabama.

Head coaching record

References

1947 births
Living people
American football defensive backs
Kentucky State Thorobreds football coaches
Knoxville Bulldogs football coaches
Tuskegee Golden Tigers football coaches
Tuskegee Golden Tigers football players